Amazone was a 32-gun Iphigénie-class frigate of the French Navy. She was the second ship of the French Navy to receive a copper sheathing in 1778.  She served in the War of American Independence under Captain Lapérouse, and later in the French Revolutionary Wars.

Career
Amazone was commissioned in July 1778, in time for the Anglo-French War that had broken out in June. She took part in the War of American Independence under Captain Lapérouse, and constituted the vanguard of the French squadron that came to support the Continental Army, arriving at Boston on 11 June 1780.

On 7 October 1779, Amazone captured the 20-gun HMS Ariel.

On 2 May 1780, she departed Brest with the 7-ship and 3-frigate Expédition Particulière under Admiral Ternay, escorting 36 transports carrying troops to support the Continental Army in the War of American Independence. The squadron comprised the 80-gun Duc de Bourgogne, under Ternay d'Arsac (admiral) and Médine (flag captain); the 74-gun Neptune, under Sochet Des Touches, and Conquérant, under La Grandière; and the 64-gun Provence under Lombard, Ardent under Bernard de Marigny, Jason under La Clocheterie and Éveillé under Le Gardeur de Tilly, and the frigates Surveillante under Villeneuve Cillart, Amazone under La Pérouse, and Bellone. Amazone, which constituted the vanguard of the fleet, arrived at Boston on 11 June 1780.

From October to November 1780, she sailed from Rhode Island to Lorient, and from there to the Caribbean. 

In the action of 29 July 1782, HMS Santa Margarita briefly captured Amazone, off Cape Henry, but the next day the squadron under Louis-Philippe de Vaudreuil intervened and recaptured the frigate.

Fate
Amazone was wrecked off Penmarch in January 1797. 6 of her crew died in the accident.

Notes, citations and references 
Notes

Citations

Bibliography
 
 

 
 
  (1671-1870)

Iphigénie-class frigates
1777 ships
Ships built in France
Age of Sail frigates of France
Age of Sail ships of Spain
Captured ships